or simply MITSUBA, is a Japanese manufacturer of automobile parts including electrical components for wiper systems, door mirrors, power window motors, fuel pumps, and pressure regulators.

Mitsuba is listed on the Tokyo Stock Exchange and as of March 2014, comprises 47 companies.

The company was involved in development of Tokai Challenger project, a solar car built by Tokai University. Mitsuba manufactured the car's brushless DC direct drive motor.

History
 1946 - Mitsuba Electric Mfg. Co., Ltd. was founded in Kiryu, Gunma Prefecture. Production and sale of generator lamps for bicycles began.
 1951 - Production and sale of auto horns began as the first auto related business.
 1956 - Production and sale of wiper motors began.
 1960 - Production and sale of starters for small motorcycles began.
 1970 - Ryomo Computing Center Co., Ltd. was founded. (Renamed to Ryomo Systems Co., Ltd. in 1982)
 1977 - Initial public offering on the Tokyo Stock Exchange.
 1987 - American Mitsuba Corporation was founded in Mount Pleasant, Michigan
 1988 - Mitsuba shares were listed on the Second Section of the Tokyo Stock Exchange.
 1989 - Listing of Mitsuba shares was changed to the First Section of the Tokyo Stock Exchange.
 1996 - Business name was changed to Mitsuba Corporation.
Established the first European production base for automobile components in France
 1997 - Mitsuba announced the New Mitsuba Environmental Declaration and Guidelines for Action.
 2006 - MITSUBA WAY was established.
 2007 - The Jidosha Denki Kogyo Co., Ltd. (Jideco) merged with Mitsuba.

Business segments and products

Auto Electrical Products 
 Field-of-vision system
 Front wiper systems
 Rear wiper systems
 Windshield washer systems
 Door mirrors
 Lamps
Convenience and comfort system
 Power window motors
Power seat motors
Sunroof motors
Power slide door systems
Winch system
Door lock actuators
Fuel tank lid openers
Relays
Horns
 Engine auxiliary module
Starter motors
Fan motors
Intelligent dynamic actuators
Drive control system
Electronic throttle control motors
Electric power steering motors
Active force pedal actuators
Electric servo brake motors

Motorcycle Electrical Products
Starter motors
AC generators
ACG starters
Fuel pump modules
General, starter and flasher relays
Actuators
Horns

Nursing Care Products
Linear actuators
Linear actuator controls and switches

Solarcar & EV Products
Solar Car Products
Motors for small EV
Motors for electric racing carts
Driving motors for small electric vehicles

General Use Products
General-purpose motors
Bicycle lighting systems

See also

 Tokai Challenger, a solar car equipped with Mitsuba electric motor

References

External links 
 Main Mitsuba Corporation website—
 Official Tokai Challenger website—

Auto parts suppliers of Japan
Companies based in Gunma Prefecture
Electronics companies established in 1946
Manufacturing companies established in 1946
Japanese companies established in 1946
Companies listed on the Tokyo Stock Exchange